Astronomy & Astrophysics is a monthly peer-reviewed scientific journal covering theoretical, observational, and instrumental astronomy and astrophysics. The journal is run by a board of directors representing 27 sponsoring countries plus a representative of the European Southern Observatory.

History

Origins
Astronomy and Astrophysics (A&A) was created as an answer to the publishing scenario found in Europe in the 1960s. At that time, multiple journals were being published in several countries around the continent. These journals usually had a limited number of subscribers, and published articles in languages other than English, resulting in a small number of citations compared to American and British journals.

Starting in 1963, conversations between astronomers from European countries assessed the need for a common astronomical journal. On 8 April 1968, leading astronomers from Belgium, Denmark, France, Germany, the Netherlands, and Scandinavian countries met in Leiden University to prepare a possible merging of some of the principal existing journals. It was proposed that the new journal be called Astronomy and Astrophysics, A European Journal.

The main policy-making body of the new journal was to be the “Board of Directors”, consisting of senior astronomers or government representatives of the sponsoring countries. This Board is responsible for the scientific and editorial aspects of the journal. The European Southern Observatory was chosen as an additional body that acts on behalf of the board and handles the administrative, financial, and legal matters of the journal.

A second meeting held in July 1968 in Brussels cemented the agreement discussed in Leiden. Each nation established an annual monetary contribution and appointed its delegates for the board of directors. Also at this meeting, the first editors-in-chief were appointed: Stuart Pottasch and Jean-Louis Steinberg.

The next meeting took place in Paris on 11 October 1968 and is officially regarded as the first meeting of the board of directors. At this meeting, the first chairman of the board, Adriaan Blaauw, was appointed, and the contract with the publisher Springer Science+Business Media was formalized.

Early years

The first issue of A&A was published in January 1969, merging several national journals of individual European countries into one comprehensive publication. These journals, with their ISSN and date of first publication, are as follows:

Annales d'Astrophysique  (France), established in 1938
 Bulletin of the Astronomical Institutes of the Netherlands  (Netherlands), established in 1921
 Bulletin Astronomique  (France), established in 1884
 Journal des Observateurs  (France), established in 1915
 Zeitschrift für Astrophysik  (Germany), established in 1930

Arkiv för Astronomi, established in 1948 in Sweden, was also incorporated in 1973. The publishing of Astronomy & Astrophysics was further extended in 1992 by the incorporation of Bulletin of the Astronomical Institutes of Czechoslovakia, established in 1947.

There were only four issues of the journal in 1969, but it soon became a monthly publication and one of the four major generalist astronomical journals in the world. Initially, papers were submitted in English, French or German, but it soon became clear that, for a given author, the papers in English were cited twice as often as those in other languages.

In addition to regular research papers in several different fields of astrophysics. A&A featured Letters and Research Notes for short manuscripts on a significant result or idea. A Supplement Series for the journal was created in 1970 for publishing extensive tabular material and catalogs.

21st century

The turn of the century brought important changes to the journal. In 2001, a new contract was signed with EDP Sciences, which replaced Springer as the publishing house. Special Editions featuring results of astronomical surveys and space missions such as XMM-Newton, Planck, Rosetta, and Gaia were introduced.

The evolution of electronic publishing resulted in the extinction of the Supplement Series, which was incorporated in the main journal in 2001, and of the print edition in 2016. The Research Notes section was also discontinued in 2016.

The journal editorial office is located at the Paris Observatory and handles over 2000 papers per year.

An archive of the published articles and related material is maintained by the Centre de données astronomiques de Strasbourg.

Sponsoring countries
The original sponsoring countries were the four countries whose journals merged to form Astronomy & Astrophysics (France, Germany, the Netherlands and Sweden), together with Belgium, Denmark, Finland, and Norway. Norway later withdrew, but Austria, Greece, Italy, Spain, and Switzerland joined during the 1970s and 1980s. The Czech Republic, Estonia, Hungary, Poland, and Slovakia all joined as new members in the 1990s.

In 2001 the words "A European Journal" were removed from the front cover in recognition of the fact that the journal was becoming increasingly global in scope.  In effect, Argentina was admitted as an "observer" in 2002. In 2004 the board of directors decided that the journal "will henceforth consider applications for sponsoring membership from any country in the world with well-documented active and excellent astronomical research". Argentina became the first non-European country to gain full membership in 2005, followed by Brazil and Chile in 2006 (Brazil withdrew in 2016). Other European countries also joined during the 21st century: Portugal, Croatia, and Bulgaria during the 2010s, and  Armenia, Lithuania, Norway, Serbia and Ukraine in the 2010s.The current list of member countries is listed here.

Editors-in-chief
The following persons are or have been editor-in-chief:
2016-present: A. Moitinho
2014-2015: J. Lub
2011-2013: B. Nordstroem
2010: K.S. de Boer
2005-2009: G. Meynet
1999-2004: Aa. Sandqvist
1993-1998: A. Maeder
1979-1992: G. Contopoulos
1969-1978: A. Blaauw

Open access
The most recent issue of A&A is available free of charge for readers. Furthermore. all Letters to the Editor and all articles published in sections 12 to 15 are in free access at no cost to the authors. Articles in the other sections of the journal are made freely available 12 months after publication (delayed open-access), through the publisher's site and via the Astrophysics Data System. Authors have the option to pay for immediate and permanent open access.

Scientific Writing School 
A&A organises Scientific Writing Schools aimed at postgraduate students and young researchers. The purpose of these schools is to teach young authors how to express their scientific results through adequate and efficient science writing. As of 2019, five of these schools were organised in Belgium (2008 and 2009), Hungary (2014), Chile (2016) and China (2019).

Abstracting and indexing
This journal is abstracted and indexed in:

According to the Journal Citation Reports, the journal has a 2021 impact factor of 6.240.

See also
The Astronomical Journal
The Astrophysical Journal
Monthly Notices of the Royal Astronomical Society

References

Further reading
  History and purpose of Astronomy & Astrophysics journal. S.R. Pottasch. EDP Sciences. 2012.

External links

Astronomy in Europe
Astronomy journals
Astrophysics journals
Publications established in 1969
English-language journals
EDP Sciences academic journals
European Southern Observatory
Monthly journals
Delayed open access journals